Saint-Michel, also referred to as Saint-Michel-d'Alajou, is a commune in the Hérault department in the Occitanie region in southern France.

Population

See also
Communes of the Hérault department

References

Communes of Hérault